BFAST is a universal DNA sequence aligner tool developed at UCLA by Nils Homer.

The BFAST Web Server can be used to align short reads to reference sequences in both nucleotide space as well as ABI SOLiD color space.

Utilities include BFAST alignment, conversion between nucleotide and color space, calculating the a priori power of the alignments, as well as a utility to perform Smith Waterman alignment.

Characteristics 
BFAST has explicit time and accuracy tradeoff with a prior accuracy estimation, supported by indexing the reference sequences. The tool can handle short reads, DNA insertions, deletions, SNPs, and color errors (ABI SOLiD color space reads).

See also 
POSIX
GPL

References

External links
BFAST at Sourceforge
Genetic Data Analysis & Research
BFAST: An Alignment Tool for Large Scale Genome Resequencing

DNA sequencing